The Falkland Islands general election of 1989 was held on Thursday 12 October 1989 to elect members to the Legislative Council. Eight Councillors were elected through universal suffrage using block voting, four from each constituency (Camp and Stanley).

Three candidates stood for the Desire the Right Party, one of the only political parties in the history of the Falkland Islands which normally acts as a non-partisan democracy, however none of the party's candidates were elected.

Results
Candidates in bold were elected.  Candidates in italic were incumbents.

Camp constituency

Stanley constituency

References

1989 elections in South America
General election
1989
1989 elections in British Overseas Territories
October 1989 events in South America